Ortiz House may refer to:

in the United States
Ortiz House (Yuma, Arizona), listed on the NRHP in Arizona
Lujan--Ortiz House, Jaconita, NM, listed on the NRHP in New Mexico
Smaine-Ortiz House, Isabel Segunda, Puerto Rico, listed on the NRHP in Puerto Rico